is a Japanese geographical term.  It means both an ancient division of the country and the main road running through the old Japanese geographical region. Both were situated along the northwestern edge of Honshū.  The name literally means 'North Land Way'. It also refers to a series of roads that connected the capitals (国府 kokufu) of each of the provinces that made up the region.

When the Gokishichidō system was initially established after the Taika reforms, it consisted of just two provinces: Wakasa and Koshi. During the reign of Emperor Temmu, Koshi was divided into three regions: Echizen, Etchū and Echigo and Sado Island was added as a fifth province. Later, Noto and Kaga were carved out of Echizen to form seven provinces in total.

The Hokuriku subregion of Chūbu region constitutes Hokurikudō region today.

See also
 Comparison of past and present administrative divisions of Japan
 Hokuriku subregion
 Koshi Province

Notes

References
 Nussbaum, Louis-Frédéric and Käthe Roth. (2005).  Japan encyclopedia. Cambridge: Harvard University Press. ;  OCLC 58053128

Regions of Japan
Hokuriku region
Hokurikudo